Enoicus fallax is a species of beetle in the family Carabidae, the only species in the genus Enoicus.

References

Platyninae